No Boyfriend Since Birth (NBSB) is a 2015 Filipino romantic-comedy film, directed by Jose Javier Reyes starring GMA's exclusive actors Carla Abellana and Tom Rodriguez. The film was released on November 11, 2015.

This film served as the comeback of TomCar love team after their 2014 romantic film So It's You from Regal Films and GMA Network and their 2014 television series My Destiny from GMA Network.

Cast

Main cast 
 Carla Abellana as Carina "Carrie" Miranda 
 Tom Rodriguez as Carlo Mercado

Supporting cast 
 Mike Tan as Paolo
 Mylene Dizon as Mimi
 Bangs Garcia as Hannah
 Ricci Chan as Glenn
 Al Tantay as Celso
 Arlene Muhlach as Sonia
 Cindy Miranda as Rachel
 Shine Kuk as Sheila
 Luke Conde as Francis

See also 
List of Filipino films in 2015
List of Philippine films based on Wattpad stories

References

2015 films
Philippine romantic comedy films
2015 romantic comedy films
2010s Tagalog-language films
Regal Entertainment films
2010s English-language films
Films directed by José Javier Reyes
2015 multilingual films
Philippine multilingual films